Ursayevo (Ursay) is a rural locality (a village) in Akbarisovsky Selsoviet, Sharansky District, Bashkortostan, Russia. The population was 106 as of 2010. There is 1 street.

Geography 
Ursayevo is located 9 km northeast of Sharan (the district's administrative centre) by road. Bikkulovo is the nearest rural locality.

References 

Rural localities in Sharansky District